I Heart Arlo (stylized as I ♥ Arlo) is an American 2D animated adventure-comedy musical streaming television series created by Ryan Crego for Netflix. A follow-up to the 2021 film Arlo the Alligator Boy, the series premiered on August 27, 2021.

Premise
Following the film Arlo the Alligator Boy, I Heart Arlo follows Arlo and his newfound crew set up shop in an abandoned seaside neighborhood and help bring it back to life.

Voice cast

Main
 Michael J. Woodard as Arlo Beauregard, an optimistic 15-year-old human-alligator hybrid boy with a passion for singing.
 Mary Lambert as Bertie, Arlo's giantess best friend.
 Jonathan Van Ness as Furlecia, a furball who owns a hair salon.
 Haley Tju as Alia, a hyperactive teenage tiger girl who drives her own bus.
 Brett Gelman as Marcellus, a sullen reverse merman.
 Tony Hale as Teeny Tiny Tony, a rodent-like creature who owns the local pizzeria.

Recurring
 Vincent Rodriguez III as Ansel Beauregard, a bird-man and Arlo's biological father.
 Annie Potts as Edmée, a local swamp hermit and Arlo's adoptive mother.
 Fred Tatasciore as Jeromio, Arlo's pet bullfrog who moves in with him early in the series.
 Jessica Williams as Elena, the mayor of New York City.
 Cathy Vu as Thao, a mailwoman for Seaside by the Seashore
 Flea as Ruff, one of Arlo's former adversaries who owns a failing swamp museum.
 Jennifer Coolidge as Stucky, Arlo's other former adversary, and Ruff's partner.
 Melissa Villaseñor as Lily the Lobster Woman, a kleptomaniac half-human, half lobster hybrid lady, and one of the newest members of SBS. Lily started off as a burden to the locals until Arlo found a use for her larceny skills, as Seaside's new lost and found department.
Santigold as the Bog Lady, a villainous swamp goddess who vowed revenge on Arlo for leaving the swamp. She is destroyed when Edmee uses her bombs to make the shack explode, and she melts into nothingness after she tried to devour Arlo and the others as they escaped from her.
Maria Bamford as Tony's con-artist mother, and additional voices.

Episodes

Soundtrack

Notes

References

External links
 
 

2020s American animated television series
2020s American children's comedy television series
2020s American musical comedy television series
2021 American television series debuts
2021 American television series endings
American children's animated comedy television series
American children's animated adventure television series
American children's animated musical television series
American flash animated television series
Animated television series about reptiles and amphibians
Animated television shows based on films
Capitol Records soundtracks
Fictional crocodilians
English-language Netflix original programming
Netflix children's programming
Television series by Netflix Animation
Universal Music Group soundtracks
Teen animated television series